Sulfamoxole is a sulfonamide antibacterial.

References 

Sulfonamide antibiotics
Oxazoles